Iemasa (written: 家政 or 家正) is a masculine Japanese given name. Notable people with the name include:

 (1558–1639), Japanese daimyō
 (born 1932), Japanese voice actor and actor
 (1884–1963), Japanese politician
 (1589–1650), Japanese daimyō

Japanese masculine given names